Patrick Heuscher (born 22 December 1976 in Frauenfeld) is a Swiss beach volleyball player.  With his partner Stefan Kobel he won the bronze medal at the 2004 Summer Olympics.  Between 2007 and 2011 he teamed with Sascha Heyer, they finished 17th at the Beijing Olympics.  At the 2012 Summer Olympics he teamed with Jefferson Bellaguarda.  They reached the round of 16.

References

External links
 
 
 
 Heuscher's website

1976 births
Living people
Swiss beach volleyball players
Men's beach volleyball players
Beach volleyball players at the 2004 Summer Olympics
Beach volleyball players at the 2008 Summer Olympics
Beach volleyball players at the 2012 Summer Olympics
Olympic beach volleyball players of Switzerland
Olympic bronze medalists for Switzerland
Olympic medalists in beach volleyball
People from Frauenfeld
Medalists at the 2004 Summer Olympics
Sportspeople from Thurgau
21st-century Swiss people